"High Rollin" is a song recorded by American singer-songwriter Jaira Burns. It was released on October 20, 2017, by Interscope Records as a single. It was written by Alex Schwartz, Jaira Burns, Cara Salimando, Joe Khajadourian, Brett McLaughlin and it was produced by Ryan Matthew Tedder and The Futuristics. Lyrically, the song is about getting high. To promote the song, an accompanying music video for the track was released on December 6, 2017.

Composition
"High Rollin" was written by Alex Schwartz, Jaira Burns, Cara Salimando, Joe Khajadourian, Brett McLaughlin and it was produced by Ryan Matthew Tedder and The Futuristics. Written in the key of E minor, "High Rollin" has a tempo of 96 beats per minute. It's an electro-R&B track. Lyrically, the song is about getting high. During the chorus, she sings "Soon as I get out of bed I/ Roll one and I smoke up/ Got to change my head/ Car wash, sittin' in my Benz/ I roll one and I smoke up/ Always keep it lit/ Cause we high rollin, high rollin".

Music video
The video for "High Rollin" was directed by Matthew Dillon Cohen. It was released on December 6, 2017, via Burns' VEVO channel. The music video starts with Burns and her friends waking up after the party, they continue the same practice in the backyard during daytime.

Credits and personnel
Credits adapted from Tidal.
Jaira Burns − vocals, songwriter
Alex Schwartz − songwriter, producer
Cara Salimando − songwriter
Joe Khajadourian − songwriter, producer
Brett McLaughlin − songwriter
Ryan Matthew Tedder − songwriter, producer
Jaycen Joshua − mixer

References

External links
 

2017 singles
2017 songs
Jaira Burns songs
Interscope Records singles
Songs written by Leland (musician)
Song recordings produced by Ryan Tedder
Song recordings produced by the Futuristics
Songs written by Joe Khajadourian
Songs written by Alex Schwartz
Songs written by Jaira Burns
Songs about cannabis